Justice Kennard or Judge Kennard, may refer to:

 John H. Kennard (1836–1887), associate justice of the Louisiana Supreme Court
 Joyce L. Kennard (born 1941), associate justice of the Supreme Court of California

See also

 Daniel Kennard Sadler (1882–1960), U.S. judge and lawyer
 Kennard (surname)
 Kennard (disambiguation)